Arnaud Lusamba (born 4 January 1997) is a professional footballer who plays as a midfielder for Turkish club Alanyaspor. Born in France, he plays for the DR Congo national team.

Club career

Nancy
Lusamba is a youth exponent from AS Nancy. He made his Ligue 2 debut on 1 August 2014 against Dijon FCO scoring his team's only goal in a 1–1 draw.

Nice
On 19 July 2016, Lusamba joined Nice.

In March 2019, he returned to Nice after seven months on loan with Cercle Brugge.

Alanyaspor
On 4 August 2022, Lusamba signed a three-year contract with Alanyaspor in Turkey.

International career
Lusamba was born in France and is of Congolese and Cape Verdean descents. He was a youth international for France. He was called up to the DR Congo national team for a set of friendlies in September 2022. He debuted with them in a 1–0 friendly loss to Burundi on 23 September 2022.

References

External links
 

1997 births
Black French sportspeople
Footballers from Metz
Living people
Association football midfielders
Democratic Republic of the Congo footballers
Democratic Republic of the Congo international footballers
French footballers
France youth international footballers
Democratic Republic of the Congo people of Cape Verdean descent
French sportspeople of Democratic Republic of the Congo descent
French sportspeople of Cape Verdean descent
AS Nancy Lorraine players
OGC Nice players
Cercle Brugge K.S.V. players
Amiens SC players
Alanyaspor footballers
Ligue 1 players
Ligue 2 players
Belgian Pro League players
Süper Lig players
Democratic Republic of the Congo expatriate footballers
French expatriate footballers
Expatriate footballers in Belgium
French expatriate sportspeople in Belgium
Expatriate footballers in Turkey
French expatriate sportspeople in Turkey